Sympistis disfigurata is a moth of the family Noctuidae first described by James T. Troubridge in 2008. It is found in the US state of Texas.

The wingspan is about 28 mm.

References

disfigurata
Moths described in 2008